The  is a two-car battery electric multiple unit (BEMU) train type operated by East Japan Railway Company (JR East) on the Oga Line in Akita Prefecture in northern Japan since 4 March 2017.

Overview
The train is derived from the experimental 817 series BEMU train developed by JR Kyushu, and will incorporate modifications to cope with the colder climate of Akita Prefecture.

It can also be recharged via its pantograph at a 20 kV AC recharging facility specially built at Oga Station.

Formation
The two-car train is formed as shown below, with one driving motor ("Mc") and one driving trailer ("Tc") car.

The Mc car is fitted with one single-arm pantograph.

Interior
Internally, the train uses LED lighting throughout. Seating accommodation consists of longitudinal bench seating. Both cars have a toilet.

History
Initial details of the new train were formally announced by JR East on 20 November 2015. The train will undergo evaluation and proving trials on the Oga Line ahead of the scheduled introduction on revenue-earning services in March 2017.

The two-car trainset was delivered from the Hitachi factory in Kudamatsu, Yamaguchi to Akita Depot in December 2016.

On November 2nd, 2020, two new sets G2 and G3 were delivered from the Hitachi factory in Kudamatsu, Yamaguchi and arrived at Akita depot two days later, on November 4th. The sets were transported coupled to each other and hauled by a locomotive as a standard freight train.

On November 16th, 2020, three new sets G4, G5, and G6 were delivered from the Hitachi factory in Kudamatsu, Yamaguchi and arrived at Akita depot two days later, on November 18th. These sets were also transported as a freight train.

See also
 Smart BEST, a self-charging BEMU train developed by Kinki Sharyo in 2012
 EV-E301 series, a DC BEMU introduced by JR East on the Karasuyama Line in 2014
 BEC819 series, an AC BEMU introduced by JR Kyushu in 2016

References

External links

 JR East news release published 20 November 2015 

Electric multiple units of Japan
East Japan Railway Company
Train-related introductions in 2017
Hitachi multiple units
20 kV AC multiple units
Battery electric multiple units